Chojnów may refer to:
Chojnów in the Lower Silesian Voivodeship in Poland
the Gmina Chojnów district, also in the Lower Silesian Voivodeship
Chojnów in the Masovian Voivodeship in Poland
the Chojnów Landscape Park, also in the Masovian Voivodeship